Amyloid beta A4 precursor protein-binding family B member 2 is a protein that in humans is encoded by the APBB2 gene.

The protein encoded by this gene interacts with the cytoplasmic domains of amyloid beta (A4) precursor protein and amyloid beta (A4) precursor-like protein 2. This protein contains two phosphotyrosine binding (PTB) domains, which are thought to function in signal transduction.

References

External links

Further reading